Gijsbrecht Thijmen Matthias "Gijs" Blom (born 2 January 1997) is a Dutch actor. He starred in the films Jongens (2014) and The Forgotten Battle (2020). He received a Daytime Emmy nomination for his performance in the Netflix fantasy series The Letter for the King (2020).

Early life and education
Blom is from Amsterdam. He is the son of the stage actress Marloes van den Heuvel. He graduated with a degree in theatre from Amsterdam University of the Arts' Academy of Theatre and Dance in 2021.

Career
From 2007 to 2009, Blom starred in the musical Ciske de Rat. In 2011, Gijs Blom landed his first feature film role in Maria Peeters' Sonny Boy. He then had small roles in the 2012 films Urfeld and Eine Frau verschwindet, the latter a German production.

Blom starred as Sieger in the 2014 coming-of-age romance film Jongens, for which he received critical acclaim and a Golden Calf nomination for Best Actor at the Netherlands Film Festival. That same year, he produced and starred as Thijmen in the short film Escapade and appeared in the films Analgesics, Nena, and Pijnstillers.

Blom starred as a disillusioned Axis soldier Marinus van Staveren in the multilingual World War II film The Forgotten Battle alongside Jamie Flatters and Susan Radder. It is the second most expensive Dutch film production of all time and had an international release on Netflix in 2021. He also appeared in the films Dead & Beautiful and The Dutch Boys. Blom has an upcoming role in the Globoplay series Fallen.

Filmography

Film

Television

Awards and nominations

References

External links 
 

1997 births
Living people
Male actors from Amsterdam
Dutch male film actors
Dutch male television actors
Dutch male stage actors
21st-century Dutch male actors